Solenogenys is a genus of beetles in the family Carabidae, containing the following species:

 Solenogenys funkei Adis, 1981
 Solenogenys rhysodoides (J. L. Thomson, 1858)
 Solenogenys thomsoni H. Reichardt, 1975

References

Scaritinae
Carabidae genera